Lewis Taylor (born 17 February 1995) is an Australian rules footballer who plays for the Sydney Swans in the Australian Football League (AFL).

From Mortlake in Victoria, Taylor attended high school at Mercy Regional College, Camperdown. Taylor was drafted by the Lions with their fourth selection, pick 28, in the 2013 AFL Draft. At only 173 cm, he has drawn comparisons with  player Brent "Boomer" Harvey due to his ability to cut sides up throughout the middle of the ground with his pace and elite endurance.

Despite having an interrupted pre-season due to a foot injury, Taylor played all 22 games for Brisbane in his debut season. He was nominated for the AFL Rising Star in round 9 and at the end of season vote count he won the award, finishing one vote ahead of Marcus Bontempelli.

Statistics
Updated to the end of round 23, 2022.

|-
| 2014
|style="text-align:center;"|
| 28 || 22 || 12 || 8 || 197 || 174 || 371 || 88 || 44 || 0.5 || 0.4 || 9.0 || 7.9 || 16.9 || 4.0 || 2.0 || 0
|-
| 2015
|style="text-align:center;"|
| 28 || 22 || 17 || 10 || 230 || 229 || 459 || 92 || 33 || 0.7 || 0.5 || 10.5 || 10.4 || 20.9 || 4.2 || 1.5 || 0
|-
| 2016
|style="text-align:center;"|
| 28 || 19 || 18 || 13 || 140 || 139 || 279 || 61 || 36 || 0.9 || 0.7 || 7.4 || 7.3 || 14.7 || 3.2 || 1.9 || 0
|-
| 2017
|style="text-align:center;"|
| 28 || 22 || 17 || 15 || 243 || 185 || 428 || 87 || 59 || 0.8 || 0.7 || 11.0 || 8.4 || 19.5 || 4.0 || 2.7 || 1
|-
| 2018
|style="text-align:center;"|
| 28 || 22 || 21 || 7 || 215 || 175 || 390 || 98 || 43 || 1.0 || 0.3 || 9.8 || 8.0 || 17.7 || 4.5 || 2.0 || 0
|-
| 2019
|style="text-align:center;"|
| 28 || 5 || 3 || 5 || 52 || 30 || 82 || 21 || 12 || 0.6 || 1.0 || 10.4 || 6.0 || 16.4 || 4.2 || 2.4 || 0
|-
| 2020
|
| 28 || 9 || 6 || 5 || 51 || 27 || 78 || 22 || 20 || 0.7 || 0.6 || 5.7 || 3.0 || 8.7 || 2.4 || 2.2 || 0
|-
| 2021
|
| 28 || 2 || 0 || 1 || 6 || 0 || 6 || 4 || 1 || 0.0 || 0.5 || 3.0 || 0.0 || 3.0 || 2.0 || 0.5 || 0
|-
| 2022
|
| 28 || 1 || 0 || 0 || 0 || 0 || 0 || 0 || 0 || 0.0 || 0.0 || 0.0 || 0.0 || 0.0 || 0.0 || 0.0 ||
|- class="sortbottom"
! colspan=3| Career
! 124
! 94
! 64
! 1134
! 959
! 2093
! 473
! 248
! 0.8
! 0.5
! 9.1
! 7.7
! 16.9
! 3.8
! 2.0
! 1
|}

References

External links

1995 births
Living people
Brisbane Lions players
Geelong Falcons players
Australian rules footballers from Victoria (Australia)
AFL Rising Star winners
People from Mortlake, Victoria
Sydney Swans players